Da Undaground Heat, Vol. 1 is the seventh studio album and ninth album released overall by MC Lyte. It was released on March 18, 2003 for iMusic and was produced by Maad Phunk, Gerard Harmon, Fred Crawford, Keith Wilkins and MC Lyte.

Da Undaground Heat was MC Lyte first independent album and her first studio release after her departure from EastWest Records five years prior. The album peaked at No. 95 on the Top R&B/Hip-Hop Albums chart in the U.S.

Track listing
"Intro" – 2:55 (Featuring Jamie Foxx) 
"Ride Wit Me" – 3:34
"What Ya'll Want" – 3:42
"Phone Check 1 Interlude" – 1:23 (Featuring Biz Markie, Naughty by Nature, Queen Latifah) 
"Fire" – 3:34
"Bklyn (Live That)" – 3:38
"Lyte Tha Emcee Pt. 2" – 3:34
"Phone Check 2 Interlude" – 0:55 (Featuring Janet Jackson, Milk Dee) 
"Where Home Is" – 4:11 (Featuring Jamie Foxx) 
"Phone Check 3 Interlude" – 1:03 (Featuring Spliff Star) 
"U Got It" – 3:07
"God Said Lyte" – 3:26
"Phone Check 4 Interlude Outro" – 2:43 (Featuring Big Tigger, Jamie Foxx) 
"Ride Wit Me" (Clean Edit) – 3:37
"U Can't Stop It" – 3:29 (Lee Majors, Hot Dyse)
"Supastar" – 4:00
"God Said Lyte" (A Cappella Version) – 3:21

Charts

References

2003 albums
MC Lyte albums